Rubén Oscar Voisard Rézola (born 21 April 1991 in Santa Fe, Argentina) is an Argentine sprint canoeist. He won the gold medal in the men's kayak doubles (200 m) at the 2015 Pan American Games in Toronto, Canada and silver medal in the men's kayak doubles (200 m) at the 2011 Pan American Games in Guadalajara, Mexico, earning him a spot on the Argentine team for the Olympics. Voisard is also a member of the canoe and kayak team for Argentina's Natural Reserve Boating Association, and is coached and trained by Damian Dossena.

Voisard represented Argentina at the 2012 Summer Olympics in London, where he competed in the men's K-2 200 metres. Voisard and his partner Miguel Correa finished fifth in the final by four hundredths of a second (0.04) ahead of the Australian pair Jesse Phillips and Stephen Bird, with a time of 35.271 seconds.

At the 2016 Summer Olympics, Rézola competed in K-1 200 m, finishing in 16th place.

He competed in the men's K-1 200 metres at the 2020 Summer Olympics.

References

External links
 
 
 
 
 
 
 

1991 births
Living people
Argentine male canoeists
Olympic canoeists of Argentina
Canoeists at the 2012 Summer Olympics
Canoeists at the 2016 Summer Olympics
Canoeists at the 2020 Summer Olympics
Pan American Games gold medalists for Argentina
Pan American Games silver medalists for Argentina
Pan American Games medalists in canoeing
Canoeists at the 2015 Pan American Games
Medalists at the 2011 Pan American Games
Medalists at the 2015 Pan American Games
Medalists at the 2019 Pan American Games
Argentine people of French descent
Sportspeople from Santa Fe, Argentina